Carnival Games: Mini-Golf is a sports game developed by Cat Daddy Games and published by 2K Play for Wii in 2008. It is the follow-up to the original Wii game, Carnival Games.

Reception

The game received "unfavorable" reviews according to the review aggregation website Metacritic.

References

External links
 

2008 video games
2K games
Cat Daddy Games games
Golf video games
Multiplayer and single-player video games
Video game sequels
Video games developed in the United States
Video games set in amusement parks
Wii games
Wii-only games